Messages: Syntax / Error is a digitally released "two sided" EP released by Ki:Theory on April 14, 2011.

Messages: Syntax ("Side" One)
 Bat Penatar
 All The Same
 Mood Board
 Trust
 Busy Body
 Hobby Shop
 Step Outside
 Daily Routine
 Save Our City

Messages: Error ("Side" Two)

 Coincidence
 We Will Becomes Ourselves Reborn
 Gloss
 Mother Brain
 Ouija
 Skeptic Believer
 Scare Myself
 Unmediated
 Yosemite

2011 EPs
Electronica albums by American artists